Votive sites are sites where animal sacrifice, in the form of bones deposited in a split in a block of stone or beneath a cairn, are made. 

The sites strongly resemble graves or tombs; however, no human bones are found. Such finds are made in Hallstatt culture sites, and presumably represent graves. Votive sites, or (North & East Saami) "seite" or (South Saami) "storiockare" (storjunkare) are representative, especially among Saami groups and hence are most common in Lappland. It was believed that stones ruled over the food resources and as such were protected from Giants by the help of Thor.  However, findings are also made down to Scania, Sweden where an earlier interpretation, in 1589, was a rendezvous point of Huns and Goths. Findings in Central Europe are usually devoted to the Hallstatt culture. A similar worship in stones is known in Crete.

See also
Ex-voto
Grave goods
Votive candle
Votive deposit

Animal sacrifice
Religious places
Sámi